Pierre Bachellerie (22 December 1898 – 31 December 1991) was a French racing cyclist. He rode in the 1924 Tour de France.

References

1898 births
1991 deaths
French male cyclists
Place of birth missing